Carol Louise Brown (born 19 July 1963), an Australian politician, has been an Australian Labor Party member of the Australian Senate representing the state of Tasmania since 25 August 2005.

Early life
Brown was born in Hobart, Tasmania. She is the eighth of thirteen children born to Julia and Rex Brown. In her maiden speech she recalled "a proud history, on both sides of my family, of union and Labor activism". Her great-grandmother Mary Butler was a founding member of the Hobart branch of the ALP, her uncle Leo Brown was state president of the ALP, and her niece Allison Ritchie served in the Tasmanian Legislative Council.

Brown grew up in the suburb of Warrane. She joined the ALP at a young age and worked as an administrative officer with the party from 1984 to 1996. She later worked as an adviser to Senator Sue Mackay (1996–1998) and then held various positions with the Tasmanian state government, including portfolio services manager within the Department of Premier and Cabinet (1998–2002), office manager for the Minister for Primary Industries, Water and Environment (2002–2004), and office manager for the Minister for Infrastructure, Energy and Resources (2004–2005). She served as an assistant secretary of the Australian Labor Party (Tasmanian Branch) and acted as state secretary in 2000.

Senate
Brown was appointed to the Senate on 25 August 2005 to fill a casual vacancy caused by the resignation of Sue Mackay. She was elected in her own right at the 2007 federal election and re-elected in 2013, 2016 and 2019. She is a member of the ALP's left faction.

Brown was elected Deputy Government Whip following the 2010 election. Following the 2013 election she was added to Bill Shorten's shadow ministry as a shadow parliamentary secretary. She was promoted to Shadow Minister for Disability and Carers in 2016, but in 2019 was returned to the rank of shadow assistant minister.

With Labor winning government in the 2022 Federal election, Brown was appointed Assistant Minister for Infrastructure and Transport in the Albanese government.

References

External links
 Summary of parliamentary voting for Senator Carol Brown on TheyVoteForYou.org.au
 

1963 births
Living people
Australian Labor Party members of the Parliament of Australia
Members of the Australian Senate
Members of the Australian Senate for Tasmania
Women members of the Australian Senate
Labor Left politicians
21st-century Australian politicians
21st-century Australian women politicians